Piruna roeveri is a butterfly in the family Hesperiidae. It is found in Mexico.

References

Butterflies described in 1972
Heteropterinae